Wikstroemia micrantha is a shrub in the family Thymelaeaceae.  It is native to China, specifically Gansu, Guangdong, Guanxi, Guizhou, Hubei, Hunan, Shanxi, Sichuan, and Yunnan.

Description
The shrub grows up to 0.5 to 1.0 m tall. Its branches are green, slender, and glabrous. It flowers and bears fruit in autumn and winter. It is often found in valleys and shrubby slopes at altitudes of 200 to 1000 m.

References

micrantha